Omanakkuttan is a 1964 Indian Malayalam-language film, directed by K. S. Sethumadhavan and produced by P.K. Kaimal. The film stars Sathyan, Sukumari, Thikkurissy Sukumaran Nair and Adoor Pankajam. The film had musical score by G. Devarajan.

Cast
Sathyan 
Sukumari 
Thikkurissy Sukumaran Nair
Adoor Pankajam 
Ambika 
Vinodini Sasimohan/Baby Vinodini
Chandni
Pankajavalli 
S. P. Pillai 
T. K. Balachandran

Soundtrack
The music was composed by G. Devarajan with lyrics by Vayalar Ramavarma.

References

External links
 

1964 films
1960s Malayalam-language films
Films directed by K. S. Sethumadhavan
Films scored by G. Devarajan